Francis Gehon (1797 – April 2, 1849) was an American politician from Iowa.

Born in Tennessee in 1797, Gehon lived in Kentucky and Illinois during his early years. He operated a trading post in Helena, Arkansas before moving to Dodgeville, Wisconsin. He served as a United States Marshal in Wisconsin.  He commanded a militia company in Wisconsin during the Black Hawk War. He later settled in Peru, Iowa, where he managed a store.

A Democrat, Gehon served on the Dubuque County Board of Supervisors. He also served as a United States Marshal for Iowa and served in the Iowa Militia as brigadier general in command of the 2nd Brigade.

In 1839, Gehon was elected the delegate from Iowa Territory to the United States House of Representatives, but never took office. The United States Congress extended the term of William W. Chapman to bring the term of office in line with the rest of the United States House of Representatives. In 1843, Gehon was elected to the Iowa Territorial Council and in 1844, he was elected to the first Iowa Constitutional Convention.

Gehon was offered command of a company of dragoons raised for the Mexican–American War, but declined because of ill health.

He died in Dubuque, Iowa on April 2, 1849 due to "congestion of the brain" (i.e., ischemic stroke).

See also
 List of members-elect of the United States House of Representatives who never took their seats

References

1797 births
1849 deaths
19th-century American businesspeople
19th-century American politicians
American people of the Black Hawk War
Businesspeople from Arkansas
Businesspeople from Iowa
County supervisors in Iowa
Members of the Iowa Territorial Legislature
People from Dodgeville, Wisconsin
People from Dubuque, Iowa
People from Helena, Arkansas
People from Tennessee
United States Marshals